Highway 139 may refer to:

Australia 
 Toowoomba Athol Road QLD

Canada
  Prince Edward Island Route 139
  Quebec Route 139

Costa Rica
 National Route 139

India
 National Highway 139 (India)

Japan
 Japan National Route 139
 Fukuoka Prefectural Route 139
 Nara Prefectural Route 139

Malaysia
 Malaysia Federal Route 139

United States
 Alabama State Route 139
 Arkansas Highway 139
 California State Route 139
 Colorado State Highway 139
 Connecticut Route 139
 Florida State Road 139
 County Road 139 (Baker County, Florida)
 County Road 139B (Baker County, Florida)
 County Road 139 (Jefferson County, Florida)
 Georgia State Route 139
 Hawaii Route 139
 Illinois Route 139 (former)
 Iowa Highway 139
 K-139 (Kansas highway)
 Kentucky Route 139
 Louisiana Highway 139
 Maine State Route 139
 Maryland Route 139
 Massachusetts Route 139
 M-139 (Michigan highway)
 Minnesota State Highway 139
 Missouri Route 139
 New Jersey Route 139
 New York State Route 139
 County Route 139 (Erie County, New York)
 County Route 139 (Monroe County, New York)
 County Route 139 (Niagara County, New York)
 County Route 139 (Seneca County, New York)
 County Route 139 (Westchester County, New York)
 Ohio State Route 139
 Pennsylvania Route 139 (former)
 South Dakota Highway 139 (former)
 Tennessee State Route 139
 Texas State Highway 139 (former)
 Texas State Highway Loop 139 (former)
 Texas State Highway Spur 139
 Farm to Market Road 139
 Utah State Route 139
 Vermont Route 139
 Virginia State Route 139
 Virginia State Route 139 (1931-1933) (former)
 Virginia State Route 139 (1933-1942) (former)
 Wisconsin Highway 139
 Wyoming Highway 139

Territories
 Puerto Rico Highway 139
 Puerto Rico Highway 139R